The Graveyard Shift is the collaborative mixtape by American rappers 40 Glocc and Spider Loc. The album was released on 29 March 2011 by Infamous G-Unit, Zoolife, Fontana.

Background
40 Glocc and Spider Loc have teamed up with DJ Drama to release a new street album, Graveyard Shift.

Track listing

References

2011 albums
Spider Loc albums
Collaborative albums